The Women's Euro Hockey League is the newest annual women's field hockey tournament organised by the EHF for the very top hockey clubs in Europe.

The competition was supposed to start in 2020 replacing the old EuroHockey Club Cup. The first edition was cancelled due to the COVID-19 pandemic in Europe.

Format
The new tournament will have the same format as the old EuroHockey Club Cup. This means eight teams will participate in knockout tournament, with the losers playing classification matches for their ranking. The tournament will be held at the same location as the men's Final 8. For the first time the women's competition will be fully produced for television and there will be a video umpire. Teams will qualify for EHL Women in a similar manner to before with the top two nations on the EHL rankings table earning two places in the competition while the next six nations will receive one entry.

Results

Records and statistics

Performances by club

Performances by nation

See also
Euro Hockey League
EuroHockey Club Champions Cup (women)
Women's EuroHockey Club Trophy
Women's EuroHockey Indoor Club Cup

References

External links
 

 
    
International club field hockey competitions in Europe
Sports leagues established in 2018
2018 establishments in Europe
Multi-national professional sports leagues